CMPI may refer to:

 Center for Medicine in the Public Interest, a research group
 Common Manageability Programming Interface, an open standard in computer programming
 Community Master Patient Index, a synonym in healthcare industries for Enterprise master patient index
 Cow's Milk Protein Intolerance, see Cow's milk protein allergy